The Admiralty Signal and Radar Establishment (ASRE) originally known as the Experimental Department and later known as the Admiralty Signal Establishment (ASE) was a research organisation of the British Royal Navy established in 1917. It existed until 1959 when it was merged with the Admiralty Gunnery Establishment to form the Admiralty Surface Weapons Establishment (ASWE). Its headquarters were located in Haslemere, Surrey, England.

History
The Admiralty Signal and Radar Establishment began as the Admiralty Experimental Department that was set up in 1917 at HM Signal School, Portsmouth, to coordinate research work undertaken since 1896 on the Torpedo School ships HMS Defiance and HMS Vernon.

Concern had already arisen in 1940 as regards the vulnerability of the Signal School to Luftwaffe bombing, but a raid in the autumn of 1940 brought matters to a head, and the move was initiated. In April 1941 the Experimental Department was renamed the Admiralty Signal Establishment (ASE) which, like its predecessors, was primarily focused on communications. Premises were found in Lythe Hill House, Haslemere, and in August 1941, the ASE became a separate establishment. Basil Willett was the Captain Superintendent. In July 1943 a delegation came from the USA to discuss radar and communications. The discussions included Henry Tizard, Cecil Horton, Cedric Holland and George Thomson. However, technological advances during the Second World War necessitated an increase in related fields of research, and in 1948 these were brought under one body, the Admiralty Signal and Radar Establishment at Portsmouth. In 1959 it was merged with the Admiralty Gunnery Establishment (AGE) to form the Admiralty Surface Weapons Establishment (ASWE).

Timeline
 Admiralty Experimental Department, (1917-1941)
 Admiralty Signal Establishment, (1941-1948)
 Admiralty Signal and Radar Establishment, Portsmouth (1948-1959)
 Admiralty Surface Weapons Establishment (ASWE), Portsdown, Portsmouth (1959-1984)

References

External links

Admiralty departments
Admiralty during World War I
Admiralty during World War II
Royal Navy shore establishments
1917 establishments in the United Kingdom
1959 disestablishments in the United Kingdom